NGC 734 is a lenticular galaxy with a central bar in the constellation Cetus, which is about 538 million light years from the Milky Way. It was discovered on November 9, 1885 by the American astronomer Francis Preserved Leavenworth.

See also 
 List of NGC objects (1–1000)

References

External links
 

734
Barred lenticular galaxies
Cetus (constellation)